Persatuan Sepakbola Indonesia Pemalang (simply known as PSIP Pemalang) is an Indonesian football club based in Pemalang, Central Java. They currently compete in the Liga 3. Their nickname is Laskar Benowo and Kacer Jawa.

History
Founded in 1970. In 2018, PSIP won the 2018 Liga 3 Central Java after beating their rival, Persibara Banjarnegara. In 2018–19 Piala Indonesia, this club made it into the round of 64.

Players

Current squad

Supporters
PSIP has 2 base of supporters namely Lasbo Mania and Ultras LBS.

Honours
 Liga 3 Central Java
 Champions (1): 2018

Kit suppliers
 Puma (2010-2011)
 Nike (2011-2012)
 RFK (2018)
 Artland Sportswear (2019)

References

External links

Football clubs in Indonesia
Football clubs in Central Java
Association football clubs established in 1980
1980 establishments in Indonesia